Kim So-hyun (born June 4, 1999) is a South Korean actress who began her career as a child in 2006, initially gaining public attention for playing pivotal roles in Moon Embracing the Sun (2012) and Missing You (2013).

She took on her first leading role in teen drama Ma Boy (2012) and since then has starred in many TV series including high-school drama Who Are You: School 2015 (2015), horror comedy Hey Ghost, Let's Fight (2016), historical melodrama The Emperor: Owner of the Mask (2017), romantic comedies Radio Romance (2018) and The Tale of Nokdu (2019), teen suspense romance Love Alarm (2019–2021) and Korean folklore River Where the Moon Rises as an assassin. Pure Love (2016) was her first movie as a lead. She was the regular host of MBC's music program Music Core and survival reality show Under Nineteen in 2019.

Kim has been nicknamed by the Korean medias as the "Nation's Little Sister", "Queen of Child Actresses", "Goddess of Historical Drama" and also the "Sageuk Goddess", after starring and appearing in various acclaimed historical period dramas throughout her career, and having gained experience working as an actress from childhood to the present day. Korean medias also recognised her as the next generation of "Nation's First Love" from her performance in Pure Love (2016) movie. 
She has established herself as a top Hallyu star. For her performance in River Where the Moon Rises, she was nominated for Baeksang Arts Award for Best Actress – Television, becoming one of the youngest nominees for the award.

Kim consistently promotes her television work on Instagram. She was awarded the '2018 Most Grown Instagram Account' with 7.1 million followers. At the age of 21, Kim became the youngest South Korean actress to have more than 10 million followers on social media, alongside actor Lee Min-ho.

Early life and education
Kim So-hyun was born on June 4, 1999, in Australia, and has a younger brother. She moved to South Korea in 2003, when she was four years old. Her father died when she was nine years old.

Kim transferred from Hoe-ryong Elementary School in Gyeonggi-do to Towol Elementary School and graduated in February 2012. She then graduated from Yongin Munjung Middle School in 2015. She was subsequently homeschooled for her secondary education, and passed her high school graduation exams by 2017. The same year, she enrolled at Hanyang University's Department of Theater, through rolling admission. Kim attended the 79th entrance ceremony held at Hanyang University in Seongdong-gu, Seoul on February 28, 2018.

In 2016, according to Singapore's national newspaper The Straits Times, Kim revealed in an email interview with the paper why she chose homeschooling instead of enrolling in high school. She said that while managing her acting career, she barely had time to study during her mid-school days (which made her have to take her exams unprepared) and missed out in activities with her classmates, and this similarly occurred in her elementary school days. Kim chose homeschooling for her high school education because she did not want to give up her education and career. With this decision, Kim felt it would allow her to dedicate more time to both filming and studying.

Career

2006–2011: Beginnings as a child actress
Kim debuted as a child actress in 2006, playing a supporting role in the Drama City special "Ten Minute Minor". Then, she diligently increased her appearances from A Happy Woman (2007), Que Sera Sera (2007), Hometown of Legends (2008), My Name Is Pity (2008), Wife and Woman (2009) and Ja Myung Go (2009).

She signed a management contract with SidusHQ in 2010. That year, she would go on to be cast in Becoming a Billionaire and King of Baking, Kim Takgu. Kim was confirmed to make her big-screen debut in Man of Vendetta (2010) as Joo Hye-rin, a daughter of a well-respected pastor who gets kidnapped. Kim was cast through a competition of 500:1. She continued to portray the child counterparts of the female protagonists in television series such as The Thorn Birds (2011), The Duo (2011) and Sin of a Family (2011). She then starred in a family comedy film, Spy Papa, about parents and children's relationship during inter-Korean relations in 1974.

2012–2014: Rising popularity and teenage roles

In 2012, Kim appeared in six works in the first half of the year: a romantic fantasy television series, Padam Padam; a historical comedy film, I Am the King; a fantasy-period drama Moon Embracing the Sun, in which she gained recognition as the younger version of the second female lead, Kim received commend from the audience and the director of how well she portrayed the antagonist's desire realistically the drama came to rank number one in its time slot throughout its run and achieved a peak recorded viewer rating of 42.2%, thereby earning the "national drama" status Kim simultaneously became "Korea's little sister"; followed by a fantasy-comedy Rooftop Prince in the role as an evil sister; Love Again and a high school student whose roommate is a female idol star in Ma Boy.

Kim reunited with co-stars from Rooftop Prince (Park Yoo-chun) and Moon Embracing the Sun (Yeo Jin-goo) respectively, in a melodrama Missing You. Being dubbed the "Queen of Child Actors"  by the Korean press, she was one of the most praised child actors of her generation. She played the role of Lee Soo-yeon, bullied by her schoolmates and called "the daughter of the murderer", who gets kidnapped and sexually assaulted while trying to save her friend. Kim and Yeo shared the highest one-minute viewer rating scene of 10.4% in the drama. She received her first acting award as "Best Child Actress" at the 1st K-Drama Star Awards for Ma Boy and Missing You.

In 2013, Kim made a surprise appearance on Iris II: New Generation as the childhood counterpart of the female protagonist and starred in The Secret of Birth as a girl with a genius-level brain. Then, she played the younger version of Lee Bo-young's character in the popular Korean drama I Can Hear Your Voice. On June 20, Kim co-host MBC's music program Music Core along with Minho of SHINee and Noh Hong-chul. The three received much attention because of the combination of singers, actors, and broadcasters even though they initially showed a bit of immature progress, but amplified expectations of how they expressed their charms despite having different careers. She then was cast in The Suspicious Housekeeper, a Korean remake of the Japanese drama, Kaseifu no Mita. In the same year, Kim was reported along with Kim Yoo-jung and Yeo Jin-goo as the top three child actors who earn above-average salaries for child actors. It was reported that Kim received 4-6 million won per episode.

In 2014, Kim was cast as a child actor beside Oh Yeon-soo in the MBC drama, Triangle. Kim challenged her first dual role and first genre through OCN's new drama Reset. Later, she was cast in KBS2 special drama, We All Cry Differently, which won the 2013 KBS Screenplay Contest.

2015–2016: Transition to lead roles and hosting

In 2015, Kim made a special appearance as the sister of the male lead in A Girl Who Sees Smells, played by Park Yoo-chun, whom she reunited with for the third time after Rooftop Prince and Missing You. On April 18, Kim stepped down from her Music Core MC posts after two years. Kim starred in KBS's school series Who Are You: School 2015, playing dual roles as twins Lee Eun-bi and Go Eun-byul. She was awarded "Star of the Year" at the eighth Korea Drama Awards for her performance. On November 21, Kim held her first overseas promotion schedule at Sunshine City, Hong Kong. At the end of the year, Kim became the MC of the 2015 KBS Drama Awards with Jun Hyun-moo and Park Bo-gum.

In 2016, she returned to the big screen in a romance film Pure Love opposite Do Kyung-soo, playing the heroine of the film who has a beautiful voice but suffers from a leg injury. Kim then starred in a mystery-school web drama Nightmare Teacher alongside Lee Min-hyuk, playing a class president who discovers mysterious secrets of the school. The drama was filmed and featured nine students at Hosan University. The same year, Kim starred in Park Hye-ryun's three-episode drama special Page Turner opposite actors Ji Soo and Shin Jae-ha. She played the role of a "piano genius" who lost her sight after an accident. The number of video previews released in the web and mobile achieved 600,000 views which was considered "an unusual number" as a one-act play. Kim's first fan meeting Lovely Day in Taiwan was held at Ming Chuan University on April 9. She was dubbed as the "Korean Wave Fairy" by the Taiwanese media. On June 4, Kim hosted the 2016 Dream Concert with Leeteuk and Hong Jong-hyun. She made her next acting move in the horror-comedy Hey Ghost, Let's Fight with Ok Taec-yeon, and played as the 13-year-old Princess Deokhye in the film The Last Princess, for which Park A-reum of K-pop Herald praised Kim for her in-depth emotional acting in the scene before her farewell to her mother (which Park called heartbreaking), as well as the high sync rate with Son Ye-jin. Also, Jung An-ji of Sports Chosun praised her for the historical accuracy of portraying the princess: citing she acted "perfectly" with the life of a girl during the Korean Empire. She had a recurring guest role in the hit fantasy drama Guardian: The Lonely and Great God. Kim showed an overwhelming presence and increased audience immersion in the early stage of the drama making a big impact as a cameo.

2017–2018: Adult roles, career instability and taking other activities

In 2017, Kim participated in Korean dubbing for the character Mitsuha Miyamizu in the anime drama film Your Name. She switched back to live-action and co-led the historical and political drama The Emperor: Owner of the Mask with Yoo Seung-ho, which premiered on May 10. This marked her first adult historical drama after five years since Moon Embracing the Sun. Despite of its high ratings, the time of the drama's original run coincided with her slump period — Kim expressed how she made efforts to understand her character as a heroine. She felt lost and started losing confidence in herself as an actress. As everybody was praising her acting and visual, she felt embarrassed because she could not come to a full understanding of who her character was.

Kim held her first domestic fan meeting "Lovely Day" on June 3. She made a special appearance in drama While You Were Sleeping to show her support for scriptwriter Park Hae-ryun, who she worked with on KBS's Page Turner. In August 2017, she ended her contract with SidusHQ after seven years. On November 11, Kim completed her second Taiwan fan meeting Sweet Dream with Allets. In December, Kim launched her one-person agency, E&T Story Entertainment, in partnership with LOEN Entertainment. The agency is currently led by Park Chan-woo, Kim's manager in her SidusHQ days.

In 2018, Kim was cast in the romance drama Radio Romance, which began airing on January 29. She played a radio scriptwriter who isn't exactly talented in writing. On January 24, a photo was shared on SNS saying that Kim was shooting underwater. The photo shows a woman wearing a hanbok in the water on January 21. On this day, the lowest temperature was recorded below minus 16 degrees. During the press conference for the premiere of Radio Romance held on January 25, the PD addressed online criticism regarding the outdoor water filming, despite the weather warnings. He issued an apology stating that "Kim So Hyun's outdoor water filming wrapped up on Sunday [January 21]. We debated on it a lot since she would be getting in the water. We ensured safety equipment nearby and a camping car on set and finished filming in the shortest amount of time possible. Due to time constraints, an action stunt double filmed additional outdoor water scenes yesterday [January 24]. It was filmed by an action actor, not Kim So-hyun, wearing a winter suit and shot in a similar situation. The number of shots was done with one take and protection was taken right away. We apologize for causing concerns with this matter. The filming set is our lives. Naturally, safety is important." At the press conference, Kim's hand was visually seen red.

On the same day, she co-hosted the 27th Seoul Music Awards with Kim Hee-chul and Shin Dong-yup. She held her first Japan fan meeting Kim So Hyun 1st Premium Fanmeeting with 800 people on July 1. After 10 years of debut, Kim hosted her own travel reality show Because This is My First Twenty - Kim So-hyun's YOLO Solo California, where she challenged herself and discovered her true identity in a foreign country. On October 12, she was named as one of the first tenth generation MCs to host a survival reality show Under Nineteen on MBC. Kim received positive feedback from viewers of the premiere for her strengths as a host, as noted by Korea Economic TV — audience engagement, her "steady" voice, charisma, as well as her styling, which the publication deemed "colorful".

2019–present: Regaining acting acclaim 

By early-2019, Kim So-hyun, Kim Hee-chul and Shin Dong-yup were selected for two consecutive years as the MCs for the Seoul Music Awards, hosting the 28th ceremony. She held her second fan meeting Sso.Affirmation.Happiness: Kim So Hyun's Little & Indeed, Happiness in Korea, ahead of her birthday with an attendance of 300 people. On June 29, she also held her first-anniversary fan meeting in Tokyo, Japan. Kim played the lead role in Netflix's original production Love Alarm, based on the popular webtoon of the same name. Kim explained her character is experiencing the emotion of love for the first time, and it reminded of herself. She decided to tap into those feelings as she wanted to portray a living and breathing character with Jo-jo. Kim Yoo-jin of Exsports News said that Kim showed a high sync rate and a "rich and stable" acting performance in the series. Forbes Joan MacDonald said that Kim fit well with the character Jojo. Further, the Netflix series was ranked the platform's 8th most loved work in South Korea in 2019.

The same year, she was cast alongside Jang Dong-yoon in a romantic comedy drama set in the Joseon dynasty, The Tale of Nokdu as a clumsy and hot-tempered Kisaeng trainee. Chon Kye-young and Hye Jin-yang, the author of both webtoons named Kim as their first choice in casting the leading woman. Shin Ji-won of Hankyung said that Kim So-hyun's character was able to mesmerize the viewers because Kim blended well with her character. Jang Dong-yoon stated, "I was convinced that there would be no better actress to play Dong Joo other than So-hyun, I was very grateful to have met my best partner in her." The pair were donned the nickname "Manhwa tearing" chemistry by the viewers for capturing everything from laughter to excitement and adding their colours to the original characters. Her role as Dong Joo earned her the Excellence Award at the year end KBS Drama Awards. The series was the 10th most talked primetime Korean dramas aired in 2019.

On October 1, an official statement from Kakao M revealed that Kim received 815 shares (about 100 million won) of it to resolve issue rights to strengthen solidarity with affiliates and entertainers. Kim is one of many Kakao M-affiliated artists who received stocks from the company, which, according to reports, is preparing to rejoin Korea Exchange through a re-IPO. On October 29, Netflix confirmed that Kim would reprise her role as Kim Jo-jo in the second season of the drama series Love Alarm.

In 2020, Kim's travel reality show Because This Is My First Twenty surpassed 6 million views as of May 2020 on YouTube, Naver TV and Facebook.

On January 15, 2021, E&T Story Entertainment released an official statement stating that Kim would be leaving the agency. On January 18, Kim signed an exclusive contract with the Culture Depot.

In February 2021, Kim starred as the alter-ego protagonists in the historical drama River Where the Moon Rises which premiered on February 15. She plays as a female general, who was born as a princess but raised as a general, and chases for her goal to straighten the ruined status of her country, Goguryeo. The drama was caught in a controversy following bullying accusations made against Ji Soo, who played the show's male protagonist. Director Yoon Sangho talked about Kim: "It is not easy to re-film the scenes that have already done with a different actor. That's why I told her before re-filming "we can't do this without you, you are the main priority in this drama, I hope you can persevere until the end as the lead. [She] accepted and continued filming [...] For this, I am nothing but thankful." Co-actors Lee Ji-hoon, Lee Hae-young, Kim Jung-young, Ki Eun-se, and writer Han Ji-hoon also conveyed their gratitude towards Kim and Na In-woo (Ji Soo's replacement) who endured the difficult situations. In an interview with Y Noblesse magazine for the July 2021 edition, Kim revealed she did not get paid for the re-shoots out of love and affection for the drama and her character. She gained praises for her solid performance and sword skills, and her portrayal of three different characters; Assassin Yeom Ga-jin, Princess Pyeonggang and the queen of Goguryeo Queen Yeon, for which she was nominated for a Baeksang Arts Awards in Best Actress - Television, becoming one of the category's youngest nominees. At the end of the year, Kim became the MC of the 2021 KBS Drama Awards with Sung Si-kyung and Lee Do-hyun This is a return to MC in 6 years since 2015.

In 2022, Kim signed with Leeum Hashtag. She then returned to the small screen in a webtoon-based romantic comedy-drama Is It Fate? by Song Hyun-wook, where she played a woman who meets her first love again after ten years.

Personal life
Kim suffered with "growing pains" and "transition period" after seven months of filming The Emperor: Owner of the Mask. She felt emptiness in her schedule and feeling uncomfortable even though she was resting.

In January 2018, the Pyeongchang Organizing Committee for the 2018 Olympic & Paralympic Winter Games (POCOG) chose Kim and Yoo Seong-min as the National Representative of Honorary Smile to represent Korea's smile and kindness.

Other ventures

Philanthropy

In 2014, Kim joined in the HAPPY Together Briquette Donation Campaign to donate 1 million briquette for the elderly, disabled families, and low-income families for heating during cold season.

In 2017, Kim and Ji Chang-wook donated their dubbing fees for Your Name to the Korea Barrier-Free Film Commission.

On April 21, 2018, Kim participated in S.E.S 10th Green Heart Bazaar held by the first generation K-pop girl group, S.E.S. Kim and many other celebrities gave generous good deeds by selling items at the bazaar. The proceeds that were collected are donated to the Green Umbrella Children's Foundation and KARA.

On April 5, 2019, Kim donated ₩10 million to help support the victims of Sokcho Fire. Kim also donated ₩10 million with her fans to Ajou University Hospital Trauma Center. This is the result of the fans giving support towards Kim's idea who wanted to achieve and sharing on her June 4 birthday. Her fans also donated 61 blood donation certificates to the hospital along with the fund to help patients who were living with difficulties. On December 13, she donated 100 kg of rice to the social welfare corporation network for underprivileged and undernourished children in the future.

On February 25, 2020, Kim donated 10 million won through Hope Bridge Association of the National Disaster Relief to prevent the spreading of the COVID-19 pandemic in South Korea. According to the organization, the donation was to help the vulnerable people and purchasing health and hand sanitizers to prevent the spread of the disease. On August 5, Kim donated 20 million won to help flood victims who suffered from the heavy rain. In October, Kim participated in the "MANNA Charity Bazaar" to support the treatment costs of children suffering from rare diseases. A representative official said, "People who have been consistently sponsoring and volunteering have been together under the name of Manna."

Ambassadorship

Artistry

Influences
Kim has cited Son Ye-jin and Canadian actress Rachel McAdams as her main influences because of their sophisticated and graceful look. She has also cited Moon Geun-young as someone who inspired her to digest various roles after watching Moon's acting in Painter of the Wind.

In 2019, Kim expressed that she has no role models. She commented, "I don't even know myself. I think it's time to get to know myself more than the role model. If I find myself, I can find my role model then."

Kim's work has influenced numerous child actresses, including Kim Ji-young, Lee Ja-in, Hwang Yeon-ji, Busters' Jisoo, Jeon Yu-lim, and Park Da-yeon.

Acting style

In an interview in 2013, she revealed she had never been formally trained for acting. While filming for Pure Love, she lived in Goheung. Kim said that, when there was no filming, she went around the city alone and listened to the stories of the residents. She explained she looked around every corner of the village setting for how she could be part of it.

To prepare for a role, Kim listens to music that matches the emotions of her role before shooting a scene. For the role of a blind person in Page Turner, she changed everything from the tone and way of speaking to the eye contact when reciting her dialogues.

She had stated that when she received a script, she set plenty of time to understand fully and know the character like a real person and try her best to express the character genuinely. Kim prefers having many projects because she feels more comfortable and happy continuing acting rather than resting. In particular, the charm of Kim's tone shines in the drama from a plump romantic comedy to a complex, subtle feeling of conflict between the family's revenge and the love she felt for the first time in her life. A broadcast official said, "The deeper the emotions in the play, the more shining of Kim's inner space will be".

Image

Kim plays a role in stimulating her colleague actors. Who Are You: School 2015 co-star Yook Sung-jae shared, "Despite her young age, [Kim] So-hyun leads the entire drama. When seeing her with a smile on her face during working in spite of the exhaustion due to lack of sleep, I feel and learn a lot." Chun Jung-myung gave her his recognition, "She is polite and always looks strong. So Hyun possesses such an outstanding charm that I believe she might become the greatest actor of this era." Actor Nam Joo-hyuk also praised, "Like an adult and trustworthy. She is a positive person that never shows any hints of negativity even when facing hardship. I have a lot to learn from her." As an experienced former child actress, Kim So-hyun has acted with many actors who are older than her. Many of her co-stars described her as an "older sister" to them. Such as, Yoo Seung-ho, who is six years older than her, confessed he couldn't stop speaking to her like she was older: "She seems like an older sister. She's extremely mature." L said, "So-hyun is very mature. Though she's seven years younger than me, she sometimes feels like an older sister", and the same goes to Yoon Do-joon.

Various actors, actresses, and film crew praised Kim for her acting skills, strong mentality, work ethic, and kindness. Actress Jo Soo-hyang, "Kim So-hyun is amazing. When we were filming, her schedule was very hectic. At first, I would play around with her after we were done filming, but she looked more and more tired as the days went on, and I couldn't do that anymore." She continued, "But when the camera starts rolling, she puts on a smile and acts really well. As I saw her doing that, I just thought, she's amazing." Despite the freezing temperatures during filming The Emperor: Owner of the Mask, Kim gave affection for the child actor that was working with her, be on set at a very early time and showed no signs of tiredness while on set. A staff member said, "Kim So-hyun is cheerful and kind both on and off-camera, making her the best energizer. Kim So-hyun's bright smile helps everyone on set have a good time while filming." Jung Ga-ram describes her as "very serious and a really great actress". Song Kang talked about working with Kim, saying that she gave a lot of advice about many heart-fluttering points. As a senior actor he saw on TV, he was worried that it would inconvenience her. Still, she contacted him whenever there were difficult scenes and congratulated him at the end of the day.

Lee Na-jung, her director in Love Alarm, said, "the acting skills were as important as the synchronisation rate. Jo-jo was a difficult role and needed great acting skills." She continued, "I saw Jo-jo's eyes in Kim So-hyun's eyes." According to director Kim Dong-hwi of The Tale of Nokdu, "Kim So-hyun is a rainbow-like actress. She is pretty, cute and cool, and has colourful charms from laughter to tears. I am always admiring her detailed and sincere acting while filming".

In the media
Kim was given several nicknames throughout her career, such as "Nation's Little Sister", "Queen of Child Actresses" and "Korean Wave Fairy". Kim earned the nickname, "Little Son Ye-jin", due to the resemblance of Ye-jin's early works, Lover's Concerto and The Classic. Besides, the two actors, also resemble the coexistence of clean, pure and mature images with subtle expressions and perfect eyes acting. She was also dubbed as "3金 Troika"  alongside Kim Yoo-jung and Kim Sae-ron due to impressive performances since childhood and a veteran actor with more than 10 years of acting career. Previously, the nickname was given to Kim Tae-hee, Song Hye-kyo, and Jun Ji-hyun in the early 2000s. Kim was named "Teardrop Goddess" for her deep sensitivity and dense tears in The Emperor: Owner of the Mask. Following the release of hit dramas Love Alarm and The Tale of Nokdu, the press gave Kim "Come-out-of-manhwa girl"  due to the perfect sync rate with the original characters and emotional performance. After starring in several historical period dramas, she received the title "Goddess of Historical Drama" and "Sageuk Goddess" because of her quick character exploration skills, varied expressions through eye contact and emotional acting. In 2016, Kim was recognized by Korean medias as the next generation of "Nation's First Love" after she had successfully portrayed the first love character in Pure Love movie.

Endorsements and impact
Kim is an active celebrity endorser for several brands and products. Her first endorsements were fabric softener Downey and junior apparel brand, Apple Pink. She became the face of Nintendo 3DS real-time pet simulation video game, Nintendogs + Cats with Kim Yoo-jung, Yuhan-Kimberly's "Teen's Nature" brand, Union Bay with Park Seo-joon and Lee Hyun-woo, and Nongshim's Shin Ramyun with Yoon Doo-joon.

In 2015, Kim has become one of the most in-demand endorsers after her hit drama Who Are You: School 2015. She was chosen to become the face of a women's clothing brand, Soup because of her "girl's liveliness and a romantic lady's vibe". Kim was selected as the 25th "Pocari Girl" for Pocari Sweat due to her "pure innocence and cheerful image". A photograph went viral on social media after Kim retweeted and left a comment, "Graduation (Graduation Photo) ㅋㅋㅋ" of a Uijeongbu High School male-student who recreates Kim's signature drinking pose, wearing short shorts and almost lying on the floor for his graduation photo. In response, Dong-A Otsuka gifted the student several Pocari Sweats, Oronamin C and named him the "Pocari Man". In 2015–16, she was featured in Domino's Pizza's advertisement with Kim Woo-bin. Two of Kim So-hyun's costume in Domino's Pizza advertisement went on for an online-auction and the donating proceeds to the Green Umbrella Children's Foundation. She also appeared in commercials for the Post cereal Honey Oh's, and Korea's school uniform Elite. Kim became the longest Elite endorsement model from 2014 until 2016. She has worked alongside Winner, Shin Ae-ra, and BtoB.

By April 16, 2016, Kim was selected for two consecutive years to become the 2016 Pocari Sweat model to commemorate the brand's 30th anniversary. It is the first time in 15 years since Son Ye-jin in 2001. The same year, G-Market announced Kim as their model for the launch of Korea's first integrated brand lift package through cable channels and online.

In 2015–17, Kim was appointed as the face for young girls' makeup brand Peripera. In three days, Peripera "Ink Airy Velvet" has sold 30,000 quantities. Kim's image was the main contributor that leads a successful product to sell 700,000 quantities in two months, sold out "Ink Airy Velvet No. 2" and "Ink Color Cara" winning in the Glow Peak Beauty Awards mascara category. In August 2019, Korean media reported Soup to become Korea's first young casual brand to record ₩100 billion sales in Korea after commissioning Kim as their promotional model for their 2019 Fall/Winter collection.

Kim continued endorsing various products that ranged from food to clothing and cosmetics such as, Norwegian fashion shoes brand Skono, chicken brand Pelicana Chicken, Samsung Securities, naturalism-oriented cosmetics Hanyul, colour contact lenses Bausch & Lomb's Lacelle, and Soup as a representative and model since 2015. In April 2020, Samsung Electronics introduced Bixby Celebrity Voice, an AI voice assistant with Kim as their speakers. Kim's "Celeb Alarm" gained popularity in South Korea and overseas, and topped the Popular Download Ranking in the Galaxy Store. In August 2022, she was selected as the global ambassador for skin care brand JM Solution.

Filmography

Discography

Soundtrack appearances

Awards and nominations

Listicles

References

External links

 
 
 Stand By: The official fan club of Kim So-hyun 

 

1999 births
Living people
Australian emigrants to South Korea
South Korean television actresses
South Korean television presenters
South Korean women television presenters
South Korean voice actresses
South Korean film actresses
South Korean child actresses
South Korean web series actresses
21st-century South Korean actresses